Ekaterina Andreevna Kurakova (born 24 June 2002), nicknamed Katia, is a Russian-Polish figure skater who currently competes for Poland. She is a two-time Warsaw Cup champion (2019, 2022), the 2019 Mentor Toruń Cup champion, a four-time Four Nationals champion (2019–2022), and a five-time Polish national champion (2019–2023).

Personal life 
Kurakova was born on 24 June 2002 in Moscow. She became a Polish citizen in October 2019. She is in a relationship with Polish ice dancer Filip Bojanowski.

Career

Early career
Kurakova began learning to skate in 2006. She was coached first by Natalia Dubinskaya and later by Inna Goncharenko at CSKA Moscow. Representing Russia, she competed internationally in the advanced novice category for two seasons beginning in 2013–14 and then as a junior for two seasons.

In the summer of 2017, Kurakova decided to represent Poland and began training in Toruń, coached by Sylwia Nowak-Trębacka. After receiving financial support from an unpublicized sponsor, she decided to move to Toronto to train under Brian Orser at the Toronto Cricket Club, beginning in December 2018. Later that month, she won the Four National Championships in Budapest, thus becoming the 2019 Polish national champion. However, due to the recent change of her country of representation, she could not compete in any ISU events until after June 2019.

2019–2020 season 
On 1 July 2019, Kurakova received her clearance certificate, allowing her to officially represent Poland in international figure skating competitions and ISU championships.

In her international senior debut at the Minto Summer Skate in Ontario, Canada, she placed first, scoring 182.77 points overall. She then competed at two ISU Junior Grand Prix events, placing fifth in Riga and seventh in Gdańsk. In November, she won gold at the 2019 CS Warsaw Cup, ahead of Bradie Tennell. In December, she defended her national title at the Four National Championships in Ostrava.

Kurakova competed at her first European Championships in January, placing tenth.  She finished the season at the 2020 World Junior Championships in Tallinn, Estonia, where she placed seventh.  Kurakova remarked afterward, "I'm so happy because we did hard work with Brian, and it was important for me to show what Brian made for me. I’m really grateful to my coaches and parents." She was scheduled to make her senior World Championship debut in Montreal, but the event's cancellation prevented this due to the COVID-19 pandemic.

2020–2021 season 
Due to the pandemic, Kurakova could not return to Canada to train in Toronto. She temporarily began training in Italy under Lorenzo Magri while receiving virtual coaching from Orser. Kurakova was assigned to compete at the 2020 Skate Canada International, but withdrew on October 7.

After winning the Four National Championships for the third consecutive year, Kurakova made her World Championship debut in March at the 2021 World Championships in Stockholm. She placed 32nd in the short program after falling on her triple Lutz in her planned opening triple Lutz-triple toe loop combination. She managed to tack on a double toe loop onto a triple loop later in the program, but her reduced technical content was not enough to advance her to the free skate.

2021–2022 season 
Kurakova began the season at the 2021 CS Lombardia Trophy, where she won the silver medal. She next competed at the 2021 CS Nebelhorn Trophy, seeking to qualify a berth for Poland at the 2022 Winter Olympics. She placed sixth in the short program after a combination error, but a second-place free skate saw her rise to the silver medal position, securing the second of six available Olympic spots.

Following the Challenger series, Kurakova made her Grand Prix debut at the 2021 Skate America, where she placed ninth. Returning to Poland to compete at the 2021 CS Warsaw Cup, she won the bronze medal, notably finishing first in the free skate. At her second Grand Prix, the 2021 Rostelecom Cup, Kurakova finished in ninth place.

Kurakova claimed her fourth consecutive Polish national title in December at the 2022 Four Nationals Championships and was therefore assigned to Poland's berth in the women's event at the 2022 European Championships. At Europeans, Kurakova debuted a new short program to Tchaikovsky's "Valse Sentimentale" and skated cleanly in that segment to set a new personal best. She executed another clean program in the free skate to earn personal bests in that segment, as well as overall and recorded a career-best placement at the event with a fifth-place finish. She cited breaking the 200-point mark as the most exciting result for her.

Named to the Polish Olympic team, Kurakova placed twenty-fourth in the short program of the women's event, narrowly qualifying for the free skate. Kurakova dramatically improved her position in the free skate, ranking twelfth in that segment and rising to twelfth overall. Posting on Instagram afterward, she exulted: "Life is not always easy. We all have to go through difficult times at times. But if you don't give up, you will be rewarded. This is what I try to convey during my program. Life is Beautiful." Kurakova finished the season with a thirteenth place at the 2022 World Championships.

2022–2023 season 
Kurakova began the season with a bronze medal at 2022 CS Lombardia Trophy. Competing in the Grand Prix, she finished in fifth-place at both 2022 Skate America and 2022 MK John Wilson Trophy. Kurakova then won the 2022 CS Warsaw Cup, her second event title.

At the beginning of December, Kurakova was named to the Polish team for the 2023 Winter World University Games in Lake Placid. She then finished first overall at the 2023 Four National Championships, earning her fifth consecutive Polish national gold medal.

Kurakova finished fifth at the 2023 Winter Universiade. Weeks later she competed at the 2023 European Championships, where she came fifth in the short program. She rose to fourth place in the free skate. Speaking after, Kurakova admitted that she felt the post-Olympic season to be more difficult, contrary to her expectations.

Programs

Competitive highlights 
GP: Grand Prix; CS: Challenger Series; JGP: Junior Grand Prix

For Poland

For Russia

Detailed results

Senior

Junior

References

External links 
 

2002 births
Russian female single skaters
Polish female single skaters
Russian emigrants to Poland
Figure skaters from Moscow
Living people
Naturalized citizens of Poland
Figure skaters at the 2022 Winter Olympics
Olympic figure skaters of Poland
Competitors at the 2023 Winter World University Games